Centerville is a ghost town in Charlton County, in the U.S. state of Georgia.

History
Variant names were "Center Village" and "Centre Village". The town's population dwindled when it was bypassed by the railroad following the Civil War.

References

Geography of Charlton County, Georgia
Ghost towns in Georgia (U.S. state)